Hans Poulsen Egede (31 January 1686 – 5 November 1758) was a Dano-Norwegian Lutheran missionary who launched mission efforts to Greenland, which led him to be styled the Apostle of Greenland. He established a successful mission among the Inuit and is credited with revitalizing Dano-Norwegian interest in the island after contact had been broken for about 300 years. He founded Greenland's capital Godthåb, now known as Nuuk.

Background
His paternal grandfather had been a vicar in Vester Egede on southern Zealand, Denmark. Hans was schooled by an uncle, a clergyman in a local Lutheran Church. In 1704 he travelled to Copenhagen to enter the University of Copenhagen, where he earned a Bachelor's degree in Theology. He returned to Hinnøya Island after graduation, and on 15 April 1707 he was ordained and assigned to a parish on the equally remote archipelago of Lofoten. Also in 1707 he married Gertrud Rasch (or Rask), who was 13 years his senior. Four children were born to the marriage – two boys and two girls.

Greenland
At Lofoten, Egede heard stories about the old Norse settlements on Greenland, with which contact had been lost centuries before. Beginning in 1711, he sought permission from Frederick IV of Denmark-Norway to search for the colony and establish a mission there, presuming that it had either remained Catholic after the Danish–Norwegian Reformation or been lost to the Christian faith altogether. Frederick gave consent at least partially to re-establish a colonial claim to the island.

Egede established the Bergen Greenland Company with $9,000 in capital from Bergen merchants, $200 from Frederick IV of Denmark and Norway, and a $300 annual grant from the Royal Mission College. The company was granted broad powers to govern the peninsula (as it was then considered to be), to raise its own army and navy, to collect taxes and to administer justice; the king and his council, however, refused to grant it monopoly rights to whaling and trade in Greenland out of a fear of antagonizing the Dutch.

Haabet ("The Hope") and two smaller ships departed Bergen on 2 May 1721 bearing Egede, his wife and four children, and forty other colonists. On 3 July they reached Nuup Kangerlua and established Hope Colony with the erection of a portable house on Kangeq Island, which Egede christened the Island of Hope (Haabets Ø). Searching for months for descendants of the old Norse colonists, he found only the local Kalaallit people and began studying their language.

A common myth states that, as the Inuit had no bread nor any idea of it, Egede adapted the Lord's Prayer as "Give us this day our daily seal". Egede at first tried the word "mamaq" but it does not mean "food", as Hans Egede thought, but "how delicious!" This first attempt stems from 1724, when he had only been in the country for three years and he has probably often heard someone say "mamaq!" It was not long before he came up with the word "neqissat", "food". When Egede's son Poul published the four Gospels in print in 1744, he used the word "timiusaq". This word was already written down by Hans in 1725 and is used by Greenlanders as an explanation of how bread looks. The old dictionaries suggest that at that time one could use the word “timia” in the sense of “bone marrow” or, as Samuel Kleinschmidt wrote in his dictionary in 1871, “the inner, porous part of the leg or Horn". “Timiusaq” therefore originally means “it which resembles bone marrow ”. Today, this word is used in it ecclesiastical languages in the sense of "wafer" and in North Greenland in the sense of "ship's custom".

By the end of the first winter, many of the colonists had been stricken with scurvy and most returned home as soon as they could. Egede and his family remained with a few others and in 1722 welcomed two supply ships the king had funded with the imposition of a new tax. His (now ship-borne) explorations found no Norse survivors along the western shore and future work was misled by the two mistaken beliefs  both prevalent at the time  that the Eastern Settlement would be located on Greenland's east coast (it was later established it had been among the fjords of the island's extreme southwest) and that a strait existed nearby communicating with the western half of the island. In fact, his 1723 expedition found the churches and ruins of the Eastern Settlement, but he considered them to be those of the Western. At the end of the year, he turned north and helped establish a whaling station on Nipisat Island. In 1724 he baptized his first child converts, two of whom would travel to Denmark and there inspire Count Zinzendorf to begin the Moravian missions.

In 1728, a royal expedition under Major Claus Paarss arrived with four supply ships and moved the Kangeq colony to the mainland opposite, establishing a fort named Godt-Haab ("Good Hope"), the future Godthåb. The extra supplies also allowed Egede to build a proper chapel within the main house.  More scurvy led to forty deaths and abandonment of the site not only by the Danes but by the Inuit as well. Egede's book The Old Greenland's New Perlustration appeared in 1729 and was translated into several languages, but King Frederick had lost patience and recalled Paarss's military garrison from Greenland the next year. Egede, encouraged by his wife Gertrud, remained with his family and ten sailors.

A supply ship in 1733 brought three missionaries and news that the king had granted 2,000 rixdollars a year to establish a new company for the colony under Jacob Severin. The Moravians (their leader was Christian David) were allowed to establish a station at Neu-Herrnhut (which became the nucleus of modern Nuuk, Greenland's capital) and in time a string of missions along the island's west coast. The ship also returned one of Egede's convert children with a case of smallpox. By the next year, the epidemic was raging among the Inuit and in 1735 it claimed Gertrud Egede. Hans carried her body back to Denmark for burial the next year, leaving his son Poul to carry on his work. In Copenhagen, he was named Superintendent of the Greenland Mission Seminary (Seminarium Groenlandicum) and in 1741 the Lutheran Bishop of Greenland. A catechism for use in Greenland was completed by 1747. He died on 5 November 1758 at the age of 72 in Stubbekøbing at Falster, Denmark.

Legacy
Egede became something of a national "saint" of Greenland. The town of Egedesminde (lit. "Memory of Egede") commemorates him. It was established by Hans's second son, Niels, in 1759 on the Eqalussuit peninsula. It was moved to the island of Aasiaat in 1763, which had been the site of a pre-Viking Inuit settlement. His grandson and namesake Hans Egede Saabye also became a missionary to Greenland and published a celebrated diary of his time there.

The Royal Danish Geographical Society established the Egede Medal in his honour in 1916. The medal is in silver and awarded 'preferably for geographical studies and researches in the Arctic countries'.

A crater on the Moon is named after him: the Egede crater on the south edge of the Mare Frigoris (the Sea of Cold). The historical fiction novel "The Prophets of Eternal Fjord" narrates a tale of a missionary priest under Egede's instruction embarking upon Greenland to convert its indigenous peoples to Christianity. 

Statues of Hans Egede stand watch over Greenland's capital in Nuuk and outside of Frederik's Church (Marmorkirken) in Copenhagen. Egede's statue at Frederick's Church in Copenhagen was vandalized with the word "decolonize" spray-painted on its base on June 20, 2020, during worldwide protests against memorials of colonial figures. Another Egede statue in Nuuk, Greenland was likewise vandalized ten days later.  In a subsequent vote, 921 voted to keep the statue while 600 wanted it removed.

Hans Egede gave one of the oldest descriptions of a sea serpent, now believed to have been a giant squid. On 6 July 1734 he wrote that his ship was off the Greenland coast when those on board "saw a most terrible creature, resembling nothing they saw before. The monster lifted its head so high that it seemed to be higher than the crow's nest on the mainmast. The head was small and the body short and wrinkled. The unknown creature was using giant fins which propelled it through the water. Later the sailors saw its tail as well. The monster was longer than our whole ship".

Gallery

References

Sources
Bobé, Louis Hans Egede: Colonizer and Missionary of Greenland (Copenhagen: Rosenkilde and Bagger, 1952)
Ingstad, Helge. Land under the pole star: a voyage to the Norse settlements of Greenland and the saga of the people that vanished (translated by Naomi Walford, Jonathan Cape, London: 1982)
Garnett, Eve To Greenland's icy mountains; the story of Hans Egede, explorer, coloniser missionary (London: Heinemann. 1968)
Barüske, Heinz Hans Egede und die Kolonisation Grönlands (Zeitschrift für Kulturaustausch, vol. 22 (1972) Nr.1)

External links

 Hans Egede entry in online Norwegian history book (in Norwegian)
Hans Egede on Norwegian stamp
SS Hans Egede

1686 births
1758 deaths
18th-century Norwegian Lutheran clergy
University of Copenhagen alumni
People from Harstad
Danish explorers
Norwegian polar explorers
Scandinavian explorers of North America
Greenlandic polar explorers
City founders
Norwegian Lutheran missionaries
Lutheran missionaries in Greenland
Norwegian emigrants to Greenland
Greenlandic Lutheran clergy
17th-century Danish translators
Norwegian translators
Translators to Inuit
Danish Lutheran missionaries
Missionary linguists